Henry Diwakar Luther Abraham (February 8, 1908 – January 1, 1987) (H. D. L. Abraham; known as Luther) was the second successor of Frank Whittaker as Bishop in Medak and an able administrator.

Writings
 Church and Evangelism
 The Teaching Ministry in My Diocese – Efforts and Deficiencies

Appraisal by Scholars
K. M. George who authored Church of South India: Life in Union, 1947–1997:

N. Sabhapathy, a former Presbyter in Bellary who wrote about the life of Abraham:

History and studies
Abraham was born on 8 February 1908 in Vikarabad, Telangana to Evangelist J. Y. Abraham and Smt. Paranjyothamma and studied at Wardlaw High School in Bellary from where he went to Anantapur and studied for a degree in Arts (BA) at the Ceded Districts (C.D.) College in Anantapur.  He went to the United Theological College, Bengaluru between 1934 and 1937.

Ecclesiastical ministry

Pastor
In 1937, he was posted to Hacholli as Assistant Pastor and in 1940, he was ordained by C. B. Firth in Adoni.  Abraham also established new congregations in Challakudlur, Ravihal, Lingaladinne and Chickbellary. He seemed to have a good influence among Village Elders and Christians in many villages.  E. Herbert Lewis, then Missionary supervised Abraham in his work.  In 1945, Abraham was transferred from Hacholli to Adoni to a Kannada-speaking congregation.

Two years later, the Church of South India was formed on 27 September 1947.  After serving three years in Adoni, Abraham was transferred to Bellary where he served till 1962.  In 1953, he proposed to start a Jathara at Chickbellary during holy Easter week for three days under the mangroves of the River Tungabhadra. It was in April 1954 that the Jathara was held.

In 1956, Abraham was sent to the Selly Oak Colleges, Birmingham to lecture on Pastoria and Church Ethics for overseas missionaries.  He was then assigned a teaching and administrative roles at the Union Kanarese Seminary in Tumkur before being transferred back to Bellary.

In 1962, Abraham was transferred to Cowlbazar, Bellary where he began serving until 1966.

Bishopric
Abraham was consecrated as Assistant Bishop - in - Mysore on 17 November 1966 at the St. Mark's Cathedral, Bengaluru by Norman C. Sargant, Bishop - in - Mysore.

After more than two years' of shepherding in Karnataka, Abraham was transferred and installed as Bishop - in - Medak on 3.2.1969 to set right some long-pending problems and to provide stable leadership.  Abraham retired in 1975 on reaching superannuation and settled down in Bellary.

Ex officio endeavours
Abraham also became the President of the College Council of Karnataka Theological College, Mangalore.

The Synod of the Church of South India again sought Abraham to set right disturbances at the Diocese of Krishna-Godavari as N. D. Ananda Rao Samuel, Bishop – in – Krishna Godavari had left the diocese in 1978 and sought refuge in Chennai, the Synodical Headquarters of the Church of South India.  Abraham was again brought to Diocese of Northern Karnataka to act as Moderator's Commissary until the consecration of V. P. Dandin in 1981.

References
Notes

Further reading
 
 
 

Telugu people
Kannada people
Anglican bishops of Medak
20th-century Anglican bishops in Asia
Indian Christian theologians
Senate of Serampore College (University) alumni
Indian Indologists
1908 births
1987 deaths
Church of South India clergy